Laurens County is a county located in the central part of the U.S. state of Georgia. As of the 2020 census, the population was 49,570, up from 48,434 in 2010. The county seat is Dublin. The county was founded on December 10, 1807, and named after Lieutenant Colonel John Laurens, an American soldier and statesman from South Carolina during the American Revolutionary War.

Laurens County is part of the Dublin, Georgia Micropolitan Statistical Area.

History
Laurens County was formed on December 10, 1807, from portions of Wilkinson and Washington Counties. During the Red Summer of 1919 there was increased racial tension in the area and in August there was the Laurens County, Georgia race riot of 1919.

Geography
It is the third-largest county in Georgia by land area and fourth-largest by total area.

The majority of Laurens County is located in the Lower Oconee River sub-basin of the Altamaha River basin. The southwestern corner of the county, defined by a line that runs west from Chester through Rentz to U.S. Route 441, and then southeast toward Glenwood, is located in the Little Ocmulgee River sub-basin of the same Altamaha River basin. A small and narrow sliver of the eastern edge of the county, from east of Lovett to northeast of Rockledge, is located in the Ohoopee River sub-basin of the larger Altamaha River basin. The county has several swamps along with Oconee river including Cow Hell Swamp.

Major highways

  Interstate 16
  U.S. Route 80
  U.S. Route 319
  U.S. Route 441
  U.S. Route 441 Bypass (around Dublin)
  State Route 19
  State Route 26
  State Route 29
  State Route 31
  State Route 46
  State Route 86
  State Route 117
  State Route 126
  State Route 199
  State Route 257
  State Route 278
  State Route 338
  State Route 404 (unsigned designation for I-16)

Adjacent counties

 Johnson County – northeast
 Emanuel County – northeast
 Treutlen County – east
 Wheeler County – south
 Dodge County – southwest
 Bleckley County – west
 Wilkinson County – northwest
 Twiggs County – northwest

Demographics

2020 census

As of the 2020 United States census, there were 49,570 people, 17,142 households, and 11,549 families residing in the county.

2010 census
As of the 2010 United States Census, there were 48,434 people, 18,641 households, and 13,060 families living in the county. The racial makeup of the county was 60.6% white, 35.8% black or African American, 1.0% Asian, 0.2% American Indian, 1.2% from other races, and 1.2% from two or more races. Those of Hispanic or Latino origin made up 2.4% of the population. In terms of ancestry, 14.9% were American, 7.0% were English, and 6.0% were Irish.

Of the 18,641 households, 35.6% had children under the age of 18 living with them, 46.8% were married couples living together, 18.4% had a female householder with no husband present, 29.9% were non-families, and 26.2% of all households were made up of individuals. The average household size was 2.54 and the average family size was 3.05. The median age was 38.0 years.

The median income for a household in the county was $38,280 and the median income for a family was $46,466. Males had a median income of $37,236 versus $27,406 for females. The per capita income for the county was $19,387. About 16.8% of families and 21.0% of the population were below the poverty line, including 28.7% of those under age 18 and 19.9% of those age 65 or over.

2000 census
As of the census of 2000, there were 44,874 people, 17,083 households, and 12,180 families living in the county.  The population density was 55 people per square mile (21 per km2).  There were 19,687 housing units at an average density of 24 per square mile (9 per km2).  The racial makeup of the county was 63.44% White, 34.53% Black or African American, 0.20% Native American, 0.80% Asian, 0.03% Pacific Islander, 0.40% from other races, and 0.60% from two or more races.  1.18% of the population were Hispanic or Latino of any race.

There were 17,083 households, out of which 33.80% had children under the age of 18 living with them, 50.30% were married couples living together, 17.10% had a female householder with no husband present, and 28.70% were non-families. 25.70% of all households were made up of individuals, and 10.30% had someone living alone who was 65 years of age or older.  The average household size was 2.55 and the average family size was 3.06.

In the county, the population was spread out, with 26.80% under the age of 18, 9.10% from 18 to 24, 28.00% from 25 to 44, 22.80% from 45 to 64, and 13.30% who were 65 years of age or older.  The median age was 36 years. For every 100 females, there were 92.60 males.  For every 100 females age 18 and over, there were 88.40 males.

The median income for a household in the county was $32,010, and the median income for a family was $38,586. Males had a median income of $29,412 versus $21,711 for females. The per capita income for the county was $16,763.  About 14.70% of families and 18.40% of the population were below the poverty line, including 26.30% of those under age 18 and 18.90% of those age 65 or over.

Education
Laurens County School District operates the county's public schools.

Notable people
 Eugenia Tucker Fitzgerald, founder of the first woman's secret society established at a girls' college was born here.
 Karl Slover, one of the oldest living Munchkins from Wizard of Oz (1939 film).
 Demaryius Thomas, wide receiver for the Denver Broncos

Communities

Cities
 Allentown
 Dublin
 Dudley
 East Dublin
 Rentz

Towns
 Cadwell
 Dexter
 Montrose

Unincorporated communities
 Alcorns
 Alligood
 Baston
 Brewton
 Catlin
 Cedar Grove
 Chappells Mill
 Condor
 Five Points
 Five Points
 Garretta
 Harlow
 Haskins Crossing
 Holly Hills
 Kewanee
 Laurens Hill
 Lovett
 Lowery
 Midway
 Minter
 Moores
 Nameless
 Old Condor
 Rockledge
 Shewmake
 Spring Hill
 Tuckers Crossroad
 Tweed
 Vincent
 Whipples Crossing

Ghost Towns
 Bender

Politics

See also

 National Register of Historic Places listings in Laurens County, Georgia
List of counties in Georgia

References

 
Georgia (U.S. state) counties
1807 establishments in Georgia (U.S. state)
Populated places established in 1807
Dublin, Georgia micropolitan area